The 1982–83 Washington Capitals season was the Washington Capitals ninth season in the National Hockey League (NHL). They qualified for the playoffs for the very first time in franchise history after eight frustrating seasons.

Offseason

Regular season

Final standings

Schedule and results

Playoffs
In the first round of the playoffs, the Capitals lost to the Islanders 3 games to 1.

(P2) New York Islanders vs. (P3) Washington Capitals

Player statistics

Regular season
Scoring

Goaltending

Playoffs
Scoring

Goaltending

Note: GP = Games played; G = Goals; A = Assists; Pts = Points; +/- = Plus/minus; PIM = Penalty minutes; PPG=Power-play goals; SHG=Short-handed goals; GWG=Game-winning goals
      MIN=Minutes played; W = Wins; L = Losses; T = Ties; GA = Goals against; GAA = Goals against average; SO = Shutouts;

Awards and records

Transactions

Draft picks
Washington's draft picks at the 1982 NHL Entry Draft held at the Montreal Forum in Montreal, Quebec.

Farm teams

See also
 1982–83 NHL season

References

External links
 

Washington Capitals seasons
Wash
Wash
Washing
Washing